Hadley Glacier is located on Mount Baker in the North Cascades of the U.S. state of Washington. Situated on the north slopes of Mount Baker, Hadley Glacier is north of Hadley Peak on a spur from Mount Baker.

See also 
List of glaciers in the United States

References 

Glaciers of Mount Baker
Glaciers of Washington (state)